The 2012 Texas State Bobcats football team represented Texas State University–San Marcos in the 2012 NCAA Division I FBS football season. The Bobcats were led by head coach Dennis Franchione, in his second year, and played their home games at Bobcat Stadium. This was Texas State's only season as members of the Western Athletic Conference. Texas State joined the Sun Belt Conference for all sports in 2013–14.  It was the second year of their transition from the FCS to the FBS, so they were not eligible to win the WAC regular season title or participate in a bowl game until 2013. They finished the season 4–8, 2–4 in WAC play to finish in fifth place.

Before the season

Recruiting
29 recruits signed on, committed, or transferred to play for the 2012 Texas State roster.

Maroon-Gold Spring Game
The Maroon-Gold Spring Game was held March 31, 2012 at 2:00 PM. Unlike other spring games where the first and third team usually combine and face the second and fourth teams, Texas State determined their teams through a Coaches Players Draft held on March 28.

The Gold team was chosen by Thaddeus Watkins, Tyler Arndt, Chase Harper, Darryl Morris, and Joplo Bartu while the Maroon team was chosen by Adley Eshraghipour, Shaun Rutherford, Marcus Curry, Brian Lilly, Jason McLean, and Isaiah Battle. These 11 players, along with Jordan Norfleet, are expected to comprise the Texas State Leadership Council for the 2012 season and will serve as captains throughout the season. The Maroon team was coached by Craig Naivar, Dennis Darnell, Jeff Conway, Mike Hudson, Dennis Porterfield, Wesley Condra, Jeff McKinley, and Vincent Ibewnike. The Gold team was coached by Mike Schultz, Brad Franchione, Jason Johnson, Rueben Vaughn, Jason Washington, Kyle Tatum, John Reid, Ron Woodard, and Eddie Veyran. Head coach Dennis Franchione would join the Texas State radio play-by-play team of Brant Freeman and Bill Culhane on KTSW for the game so he could evaluate his players from the press box area.

Sources:

It was a hard fought battle between the Maroon and Gold teams. The Gold team got out to an early 17-0 lead with 7:30 left in the first half thanks to a 40-yard touchdown pass from Tyler Arndt to Jafus Gaines and a 13-yard touchdown pass from Jack Rhoades to Larry Centers, Junior, but the maroon team wouldn't be discouraged. Duke DeLancellotti completed a 31-yard touchdown pass to Marcus Curry with 17 second left in the first half to get the maroon team back in the game. DeLancellotti would make it that much closer in the third quarter with a 60-yard touchdown pass to Marcus Curry, but the gold team would strike two seconds into the fourth quarter with a Terrance Franks 25-yard touchdown run that the Gold team would never relinquish. Arndt ended the day completing 13 of his 19 passes for 218 yards. He also gained 22 yards on five carries. Rhoades completed both of his passes for 50 yards.

The leading receiver for the Gold team was Andy Erickson, who caught five passes for 119 yards. He had the longest reception in the game when he caught a 70-yard throw from Arndt. Gaines also caught three passes for 81 yards and Chandler Coffey caught a 37-yard pass from Rhoades after moving over to the offense this spring.

Franks led the rushing attack for the Gold team with 64 yards on 11 carries.

Freshman quarterback Jordan Moore was the leading rusher for the Maroon team after gaining 46 yards on 13 carries. Curry also gained 30 yards on five carries and caught three passes for 71 yards.

Roster

Schedule

Game summaries

Houston

Texas State leads the series 3-1. The last meeting was in 2010, and it was the lone Texas State loss to Houston with a 68-28 loss. The other 3 meetings took place from 1945-1947 when both teams were members of the Lone Star Conference. This will be the third meeting in Houston (1946, 2010) with the two teams split at 1-1 overall in Houston games.

Sources:

Texas Tech

Sources:

Stephen F. Austin

Sources:

Nevada

Sources:

New Mexico

Sources:

Idaho

Sources:

San Jose State

Sources:

Utah State

Sources:

Louisiana Tech

Sources:

Navy

Sources:

UTSA

Sources:

Idaho

Sources:

Notes

References

Texas State
Texas State Bobcats football seasons
Texas State Bobcats football